The 126th Air Refueling Wing (126 ARW) is a unit of the Illinois Air National Guard, stationed at Scott Air Force Base, Belleville, Illinois. If activated to federal service, the Wing is gained by the United States Air Force Air Mobility Command.

The 108th Air Refueling Squadron, assigned to the Wing's 126th Operations Group, is a descendant organization of the World War I 108th Aero Squadron, established on 27 August 1917. It was reformed on 1 July 1927, as the 108th Observation Squadron, and is one of the 29 original National Guard Observation Squadrons of the United States Army National Guard formed before World War II.

Mission
The primary mission of the 126th Air Refueling Wing is to provide air refueling support to major commands of the United States Air Force, as well as other U.S. military forces and the military forces of allied nations. Additionally, the unit can support airlift missions. The unit is also tasked with supporting the nuclear strike missions of the Single Integrated Operational Plan.

During peacetime, the 126th ARW receives direction through the adjutant general of Illinois, the governor of Illinois and the National Guard Bureau. Upon federal mobilization, the wing is assigned to Air Mobility Command and the 15th Expeditionary Mobility Task Force.

Units
 126th Operations Group
 108th Air Refueling Squadron
906th Air Refueling Squadron

 126th Maintenance Group
 126th Mission Support Group
 126th Medical Group.

The 126 ARW also has two associate partners: the Active Associate 906th Air Refueling Squadron with the 126 ARW serving as the host organization for this Total Force Initiative association, and the Classic Associate 126th Supply Chain Management Squadron as part of a regionalized Air Mobility Command supply facility.

History

World War II

The 344th Bombardment Group (Medium) was constituted on 31 August 1942, and activated on 8 September 1942 at Drane Field in Lakeland, Florida, an auxiliary facility to MacDill Field in Tampa. Initially, the group was equipped with Martin B-26 Marauders and served as a replacement training unit. Moved to RAF Stansted, England, January–February 1944 and assigned to Ninth Air Force.

The 344th BG began operations in March 1944, attacking airfields, missile sites, marshaling yards, submarine shelters, coastal defenses, and other targets in German-occupied France, Belgium, and the Netherlands. Beginning in May, the 344th helped prepare for the Normandy invasion by striking vital bridges in France. The Pathfinders were a provisional squadron equipped with the top-secret Pff (Oboe) navigational equipment. The Pathfinders would lead a group of 17 planes over the target. The 344th Bombardment Group was selected to lead the IX Bomber Command formations on D-Day, with the first aircraft taking off at 04:12 hours, attacking coastal batteries at Cherbourg, and during the remainder of June, it supported the drive that resulted in the seizure of the Cotentin Peninsula.

The unit also defended positions to assist British forces in the area of Caen and received a Distinguished Unit Citation for a three-day action against the enemy in late July when the group struck troop concentrations, supply dumps, a bridge, and a railroad viaduct to assist advancing ground forces at Saint-Lô.

Another action of the 344th was to knock out bridges to hinder the German Army's withdrawal through the Falaise gap, and bombed vessels and strong points at Brest during August and September.

On 30 September the 344th moved to their Advanced Landing Ground at Cormeilles-en-Vexin, France, France (A-59). While at Stansted the group flew over 100 missions, and lost 26 aircraft in combat.

After V-E Day the group moved to Schleissheim, Germany for occupation duty and began training with Douglas A-26 Invaders, but continued to use B-26 aircraft. It was transferred, without personnel and equipment, to the United States on 15 February 1946 where it was inactivated on 31 March 1946.

Cold War

Redesignated 126th Bombardment Group (Light). Allotted to Illinois Air National Guard on 24 May 1946 and assigned to Chicago Municipal Airport.

Extended federal recognition on 29 June 1947. Redesignated 126th Composite Group in November 1950, and 126th Bombardment Group (Light) in February 1951. The unit was ordered to active service on 1 April 1951 as a result of the Korean War. The unit was initially assigned to Tactical Air Command at Langley AFB, Virginia.

The wing moved to Bordeaux-Merignac Air Base, France with the first elements arriving in November 1951. The 126th BW was assigned to United States Air Forces in Europe. By 10 November, Bordeaux was considered an operational base and was assigned to the 12th Air Force.

At Bordeaux, the 126th BW consisted of the 108th, 168th and 180th Bomb Squadrons (Light). The aircraft were marked by various color bands on the vertical stabilizer and rudder. Black/Yellow/Blue for the 108th; Black/Yellow/Red for the 168th, and Black/Yellow/Green for the 180th.

It flew B-26's for training and maneuvers and stayed at Bordeaux AB until being transferred Laon AB, France on 25 May 1952 where it remained for the balance of the year.

The 126th was relieved from active duty and transferred, without personnel and equipment, back to the control of the Illinois ANG on 1 January 1953 as the 126th Fighter-Bomber Group and assigned to Tactical Air Command. Flew F-86 Sabres. In 1955, redesignated as the 125th Fighter-Interceptor Group, equipped with F-86Ds.

On 1 July 1961, the 125th's mission was changed to an air refueling one and was redesignated as the 126th Air Refueling Group, being assigned the KC-97 aircraft.

Reassigned to Strategic Air Command 1 July 1976 at Chicago O’Hare International Airport and redesignated as the 126th Air Refueling Wing. The 126th AREFW flew KC-97Ls for a brief time before converting to KC-135As. It was composed of the 108th Air Refueling Squadron and the 145th Air Refueling Squadron from the Ohio ANG along with the 126th Air Refueling Squadron from the Wisconsin ANG. In 1978 the KC-97s were sent to AMARC. Many of the 126th AREFW's KC-97Ls became gate guards and one is on the field of the former Grissom AFB, Indiana, where the 126th AREFW conducted many hours of transition practice.

In 1983 the wing began receiving the KC-135E as a replacement for the "A" model water-wagons, a named used because of 110 seconds of water injection, used to increase thrust for take-off power. With the inactivation of SAC, the group was assigned to Air Mobility Command on 1 June 1992.

Post Cold War
The 126th moved from the former Air Reserve Station at O'Hare International Airport in 1999 as recommended by the Base Realignment and Closure Commission's Report to Congress in conjunction with the closure of the Air Force Reserve and Air National Guard facilities at O'Hare.
In 2000, the unit's KC-135E aircraft were upgraded with the new Pacer CRAG (Compass, Radar & GPS) avionics systems.
In 2008, the unit completed a transition to KC-135R aircraft as the KC-135E fleet was retired.

Lineage

 Constituted as 344th Bombardment Group (Medium) on 31 August 1942
 Activated on 8 September 1942
 Inactivated on 31 March 1946
 Re-designated: 126th Bombardment Group (Light) and allotted to Illinois ANG on 24 May 1946
 Extended federal recognition on 29 June 1947
 Established as 126th Composite Wing, and allotted to Illinois ANG, 31 October 1950
 Organized and received federal recognition, 1 November 1950, assuming personnel and equipment of 66th Fighter Wing (Inactivated)
 126th Composite Group assigned as subordinate unit
 Re-designated: 126th Bombardment Wing (Light) in Feb 1951
 Group re-designated 126th Bombardment Group
 Federalized and ordered to active service on: 1 April 1951
 Released from active duty and returned to Illinois state control, 1 January 1953
 Re-designated: 126th Fighter-Bomber Wing, 1 January 1953
 Group re-designated 126th Fighter-Bomber Group
 Re-designated: 126th Fighter-Interceptor Wing, 1 July 1955
 Group re-designated 126th Fighter-Interceptor Group
 Re-designated: 126th Air Refueling Wing, 1 July 1961
 Group re-designated 126th Air Refueling Group
 126th Air Refueling Group inactivated 30 June 1974
 Group re-activated and re-designated 126th Operations Group, 1 June 1992

Assignments
 III Air Support Command, 8 September 1942 – 26 January 1944
 99th Bombardment Wing, 9 February 1944
 United States Air Forces in Europe
 Attached to: XII Fighter Command, 15 September 1945 – 15 February 1946
 66th Fighter Wing, 29 June 1947
 Illinois Air National Guard, 31 October 1950
 Gained by: Tactical Air Command
 Ninth Air Force, 1 April 1951
 Elements attached to: Seventeenth Air Force, United States Air Forces in Europe, 1 November 1951 – 1 January 1953
 Illinois Air National Guard, 1 January 1953 – Present
 Gained by: Tactical Air Command, 1 January 1953
 Gained by: Air Defense Command, 1 July 1955
 Gained by: Tactical Air Command, 1 July 1961
 Gained by: Strategic Air Command, 1 July 1976
 Gained by: Air Combat Command, 30 June 1992
 Gained by: Air Mobility Command, 1 Oct 1993–Present

Components

World War II
 494th Bombardment Squadron (K9), 8 September 1942 – 31 March 1946
 495th Bombardment Squadron (Y5), 8 September 1942 – 31 March 1946
 496th Bombardment Squadron (N3), 8 September 1942 – 31 March 1946
 497th Bombardment Squadron (7I), 8 September 1942 – 30 December 1945

Air National Guard
 126th Composite (later Bombardment, Fighter-Bomber, Fighter-Interceptor, Air Refueling) Group, 1 November 1951 – 30 June 1974
 108th Bombardment (later Fighter-Bomber, later Fighter-Interceptor, later Air Refueling) Squadron, 19 October 1947 – Present
 168th Bombardment (later Fighter Bomber, later Fighter-Interceptor) Squadron, 19 October 1947 – 31 May 1958 (GSU O’Hare IAP, Chicago)
 169th Fighter (later Fighter-Interceptor, Fighter-Bomber, Tactical Fighter, Air Refueling) Squadron, 29 June 1947 – 1 October 1961; 31 August-15 October 1962 (GSU Peoria)

Stations

United States Army Air Forces
 Chicago Municipal Airport, Illinois, 1 July 1927 – 8 February 1941
 Howard Field, Panama, 8 February 1941 – 1 November 1943
 MacDill Field, Florida, 8 September 1942
 Drane Field, Florida 28 December 1942
 Hunter Field, Georgia 19 December 1943 – 26 January 1944
 RAF Stansted (USAAF Station 169), England, February 1944 (Station 169)
 Cormeilles en Vexin Airfield (A-59), France, 30 September 1944 (ALG A-59)
 Florennes/Juzaine Airfield (A-78), Belgium, 5 April 1945 (ALG A-78)
 Schleissheim Palace, Germany, 15 September 1945 – 15 February 1946 (Ground Echelon)

Illinois Air National Guard
 Chicago Municipal Airport, Illinois 24 May 1946 – 1 April 1951
 Langley AFB, Virginia, 1 April –  1 November 1951
 Bordeaux-Merignac Air Base, France 1 November 1951 – 25 May 1952
 Laon-Couvron Air Base, France, 25 May 1952 – 31 December 1952
 Chicago Municipal Airport (Later moved to O'Hare IAP) Illinois, 1 January 1953 – 31 July 1999
 Scott AFB, Illinois, 31 July 1999 –  present

Note: ALG = "Advanced Landing Ground" designation of temporary airfields constructed or used by the Allies in Europe following the D-Day landings in 1944.

Aircraft
 B-26 Marauder, 1942–1945
 A-26 Invader, 1945
 F-51D Mustang, 1953–1955
 F-84F Thunderstreak, 1955–1957
 F-86L Sabre Interceptor, 1957–1958
 KC-97 Stratofreighter, 1961–1976
 KC-135 Stratotanker (1976–present)

See also

 List of Martin B-26 Marauder operators

References

 Endicott, Judy G. (1999) Active Air Force wings as of 1 October 1995; USAF active flying, space, and missile squadrons as of 1 October 1995. Maxwell AFB, Alabama: Office of Air Force History. CD-ROM.
 McAuliffe, Jerome J. (2005). US Air Force in France 1950–1967. San Diego, California: Milspec Press, Chapter 6, Bordeaux-Merignac Air Base. .
 Maurer, Maurer (1983). Air Force Combat Units of World War II. Maxwell AFB, Alabama: Office of Air Force History. .
 Ravenstein, Charles A. (1984). Air Force Combat Wings Lineage and Honors Histories 1947–1977. Maxwell AFB, Alabama: Office of Air Force History. .
 Rogers, Brian (2005). United States Air Force Unit Designations Since 1978. Hinkley, England: Midland Publications. .
 Johnson, David C. (1988), U.S. Army Air Forces Continental Airfields (ETO), D-Day to V-E Day; Research Division, USAF Historical Research Center, Maxwell AFB, Alabama.

External links
 
 126th Air Refueling Wing Homepage
 Pima Air and Space Facebook Page for historic photos of the 344th Bombardment Group 

Wings of the United States Air National Guard
0126
Military units and formations in Illinois
Military units and formations established in 1942
1942 establishments in Illinois